Dégelis is a city in Témiscouata Regional County Municipality within the Bas-Saint-Laurent region of Quebec. Its population in the Canada 2011 Census was 3,051.

Toponymy
Located on the banks of the Madawaska River (Saint John River), the city owes its name to a physical phenomenon: a zone of the river located in front the village, that never freezes. A Dégelis, in Old French, means a zone on the water free of ice (which is the phenomenon observed in Dégelis), a local winter thaw (no apparent reason), meaning an opening in the ice during the seasonal thawing.

The area corresponding to Dégelis is named Dégelé (English: thawed) in a report by Joseph Bouchette in 1815. The spelling at the time varies considerably. Clerical and administrative documents dating from 1858 to 1878 refer to the parish under the name Dégely, Ste. Rose Dégely, or (Sainte-Rose-du) Dégeli. Names "Sainte-Rose-du-Dégel" and "Dègelis" were also used for a period.

The mission Catholic founded in 1860 took the name of "Sainte-Rose-du-Dégelé. The choice of Sainte-Rose as a protective was conducted by Langevin, bishop of Rimouski from 1867 to 1891 in honor of Rose Marquis, benefactress of the mission. The parish canonically was erected in 1885 and the municipality of parish was officially created the same year kept the same name. This does not prevent Le Naturaliste Canadien (English: The Canadian Naturalist), a scientific publication, refer to them as the Sainte-Rose-du-Dégelis in 1882. The post office of the place was called Sainte-Rose-du-Dégelé since 1879 and kept it until 1968. In fact, 1967, the name of the municipality was changed to Sainte-Rose-du-Dégelis for lexical considerations. In 1969, the name was shortened to Dégelis when the place received town status.

The inhabitants are appointed Dégelisiens for males and Dégelisiennes for females.

Geography

The town is situated on Autoroute 85, also known as the Trans-Canada Highway, close to the Quebec-New Brunswick Border.

City Dégelis is in the Témiscouata Regional County Municipality in administrative region of the Bas-Saint-Laurent. Parish Dégelis is part of the Archdiocese of Rimouski.

History
Dégelis was founded in 1885 and its initial name was Sainte-Rose du Dégelé. Before its foundation, it was a military fort used to defend Canada's border with United States. Four families of British soldiers lived in two locations in the territory of the current city from 1814 to 1823 . In 1839, the construction of the fort began on the current city of Dégelis. The small fort was part of a series of forts which included Fort Ingall. Soldiers and settlers inhabited the fort and its surrounding area. Some settlers remained in the region after the Aroostook War.

The catholic mission Sainte-Rose-du-Dégelé was founded in 1860. The foundation's mission coincides with the beginning of colonization of the territory then known as Le Dégely.

Demographics 

The mother tongue of most residents is, and has always been, French.

Economy
The economy of Dégelis revolves mainly around the forest industry. The city is home to a sawmill which produces hardwood briquettes of maple, oak, beech, and ash.  The municipality has reduced hours of operation.

See also
Iroquois River (Saint John River)
List of cities in Quebec

References

External links 

  Official municipality site

Cities and towns in Quebec
Incorporated places in Bas-Saint-Laurent
Canada geography articles needing translation from French Wikipedia